An aircraft tire or tyre is designed to withstand extremely heavy loads for short durations. The number of tires required for aircraft increases with the weight of the aircraft, as the weight of the airplane needs to be distributed more evenly. Aircraft tire tread patterns are designed to facilitate stability in high crosswind conditions, to channel water away to prevent hydroplaning, and for braking effect.

Aircraft tires also include fusible plugs (which are assembled on the inside of the wheels), designed to melt at a certain temperature. Tires often overheat if maximum braking is applied during an aborted takeoff or an emergency landing. The fuses provide a safer failure mode that prevents tire explosions by deflating in a controlled manner, thus minimizing damage to aircraft and objects in the surrounding environment.

Inflation

Each tire is worth about $5,000.
The high pressure and weight load on the Concorde tyres were a significant factor in the loss of Air France Flight 4590.

Tests of airliner aircraft tires have shown that they are able to sustain pressures of maximum  before bursting. During the tests the tires have to be filled with water, to prevent the test room being blown apart by the energy that would be released by a gas when the tire bursts.

Aircraft tires are usually inflated with nitrogen to minimize expansion and contraction from extreme changes in ambient temperature and pressure experienced during flight. Dry nitrogen expands at the same rate as other dry atmospheric gases (normal air is about 80% nitrogen), but common compressed air sources may contain moisture, which increases the expansion rate with temperature.

The requirement that an inert gas, such as nitrogen, be used instead of air for inflation of tires on certain transport category airplanes was prompted by at least three cases in which the oxygen in air-filled tires had combined with volatile gases given off by a severely overheated tire and exploded upon reaching autoignition temperature. The use of an inert gas for tire inflation eliminates the possibility of tire explosion.

Manufacturers
The aircraft tire manufacturing industry is dominated by a four firm oligopoly that controls 85% of market share.

The four major manufacturers in aircraft tire manufacturing are the following according to a report by Pelmar Engineering in 2013:

 Goodyear (United States)
 Michelin (France)
 Dunlop Aircraft Tyres (United Kingdom)
 Bridgestone (Japan)

These firms control approximately 85% of the manufacturing market and account for most of the retreads. Dunlop is the smallest player among the major firms with revenue reported at £40m in a 2015 media report.

There are several other smaller industry players, particularly in China. Among these producers are Guilin-based Guilin Lanyu Aircraft Tire Development Co., a subsidiary of ChemChina that was founded in 1980; a Yinchuan, Ningxia located aircraft tire plant owned by Singapore-based Giti Tire; and Qingdao, Shandong-based Sentury Tire, which manufactures tires for the Boeing 737.

Weihai, Shandong-based Triangle Group announced in 2012 a collaboration with the Harbin Institute of Technology for designing and manufacturing aircraft tires.

Former manufacturers
Japanese company Yokohama Rubber had been manufacturing aircraft tires since 1940 but shut down its operations and made no more deliveries after 2009.  The company decided to close down the aircraft unit because its sales were low, having revenue of only 800 million JPY or about US$8 million in the 2008-9 fiscal year, and it assessed the future outlook of the industry as lacking in strong growth.

See also
 Tundra tire

References

Tires
Tire industry